The Royal Northumberland Fusiliers was an infantry regiment of the British Army. Raised in 1674 as one of three 'English' units in the Dutch Anglo-Scots Brigade, it accompanied William III to England in the November 1688 Glorious Revolution and became part of the English establishment in 1689. 

In 1751, it became the 5th Regiment of Foot, with the regional title 'Northumberland' added in 1782; in 1836,  it was designated a Fusilier unit and became the 5th (Northumberland Fusiliers) Regiment of Foot. 

After the 1881 Childers Reforms, it adopted the title Northumberland Fusiliers, then Royal Northumberland Fusiliers on 3 June 1935. In 1968, it was amalgamated with the Royal Fusiliers (City of London Regiment), the Royal Warwickshire Fusiliers and Lancashire Fusiliers to form the present Royal Regiment of Fusiliers.

History

Formation to end of 17th century
 
Although briefly designated as 'Irish' when raised in January 1675, the regiment was listed as one of three 'English' units in the Dutch Anglo-Scots Brigade, a mercenary formation whose origins went back to 1586. During the 1672-1678 Franco-Dutch War, it took part in the unsuccessful Siege of Maastricht and the battles of Cassel and Saint-Denis. It accompanied William III to England in the November 1688 Glorious Revolution, before transferring onto the English establishment in 1689.

Like most regiments, until 1751, when it was designated the 5th Regiment of Foot, it was named after the current colonel. Founded by Daniel O'Brien, 3rd Viscount Clare, it began life as Viscount Clare's Regiment, then Sir John Fenwick's, followed by Patrick Westley in 1676. When transferred onto the English establishment, it was commanded by Thomas Tollemache who was replaced in May 1689 by Edward Lloyd.

Posted to Ireland for the 1689-1691 Williamite War, it fought at the Battle of the Boyne, the Second Siege of Athlone and the 1691 Siege of Limerick. Following the October 1691 Treaty of Limerick, it was sent to Flanders for the duration on the Nine Years War. Lloyd died in 1694 and replaced as Colonel by Thomas Fairfax; during the 1695 Siege of Namur, it formed part of Vaudémont's screening force. When the war ended with the 1697 Treaty of Ryswick, it avoided disbandment by being made part of the Irish garrison.

The 18th century

The regiment remained in Ireland for the first part of the War of the Spanish Succession, before being sent to Portugal in 1707 as part of the army under the Earl of Galway. Its first serious action was the May 1709 Battle of La Gudina; a disastrous defeat, where the Allies lost over 4,000 prisoners, the regiment took part in a rearguard action that enabled the rest of the army to withdraw. 

This ended offensive operations and when the war ended in 1713, the regiment was posted to Gibraltar, where it spent the next 15 years. It was part of the garrison during the 1727 Anglo-Spanish War, when the Spanish besieged Gibraltar for over four months.

On 1 July 1751, a royal warrant provided that in future regiments would not be known by their colonels' names, but by their "number or rank" and it became the 5th Regiment of Foot.

During the Seven Years' War, it was engaged in the 1758 Raid on Cherbourg, the 1760 Battle of Warburg and Kirch Denkern in 1761, where they captured an entire French regiment. It also took part in the 1762 Battle of Wilhelmsthal, before returning to Ireland after the 1763 Treaty of Paris. Due to the increasing tensions that later resulted in the American Revolutionary War, the regiment was shipped to Boston, Massachusetts in May 1774. Elements of the unit were involved in the Battle of Lexington and Concord in April 1775 and the Battle of Bunker Hill in June.

After being evacuated to Halifax, Nova Scotia, in 1776 the 5th took part in the expedition to New York, including the battles of Long Island and White Plains, and capture of Fort Washington and Fort Lee, New Jersey. They subsequently joined Howe's 1777 campaign against Philadelphia; at Brandywine Creek, they broke the Continental Army's centre and captured five cannon. Despite this success, in 1778 the British army withdrew and the regiment was involved in fighting at Monmouth Court House.

In November 1778, they left New York for last time and were transported to the French West Indies, where on 13 December 1778, they landed on Saint Lucia. The 5th was engaged with a small force of French and captured a four-cannon battery. On 18 December 1778, a force of 9,000 French troops landed on St. Lucia. The small British force of 1,400 men occupied a hill located on the neck of a peninsula. The French were fairly raw soldiers trained to fight in the classic European style of linear battles. The French advanced on the British force several times. The British, veterans of colonial fighting, inflicted a stinging defeat on the French. The French lost 400 killed and 1100 wounded to the British losses of ten killed and 130 wounded, which included two officers from the 5th Foot.

After two years in the West Indies, the 5th Foot was sent to Ireland in December 1780. They were still in Ireland when hostilities between Great Britain, France, Spain, the Netherlands, and the former Colonies officially ended in 1783.

On 1 August 1782, all those regiments of the line that did not have a special title were given a county designation. The primary purpose was to improve recruiting, but no links were actually formed with the counties after which the regiments were named. The 5th became the "5th (Northumberland) Regiment of Foot": the county being chosen as a compliment to the colonel, Hugh Percy, 1st Duke of Northumberland.

19th century
The regiment embarked for Portugal in July 1808 for service in the Peninsular War. The regiment fought in the Battle of Roliça and the Battle of Vimeiro in August 1808, the Battle of Corunna in January 1809 and the Battle of Bussaco in September 1810. It earned the nicknames the "Old and Bold", "The Fighting Fifth" and also "Lord Wellington's Bodyguard". It formed part of a small force which beat off an overwhelming body of the enemy at El Boden in 1811, a performance which Wellington notified to the Army as a memorable example of what can be done by steadiness, discipline, and confidence.
The regiment was in the 3rd Division, 2nd Brigade under command of Major General Charles Colville, consisting of the 1st/5th Regiment of Foot, 2nd/83rd Regiment of Foot, 2nd/87th Regiment of Foot and the 94th Regiment of Foot.

The regiment went on to fight at the Siege of Ciudad Rodrigo in January 1812, the Battle of Badajoz in April 1812 and the Battle of Salamanca in July 1812 as well as the Battle of Vitoria in June 1813. It then pursued the French Army into France and saw action at the Battle of Nivelle in November 1813, the Battle of Orthez in February 1814 and the Battle of Toulouse in April 1814.

The 1st Battalion served on the Canadian frontier in 1814, during the War of 1812. It then returned to Europe but arrived too late to take part in the battle of Waterloo, though it did serve in the army of occupation in France.

On 4 May 1836, the 5th became a fusilier regiment and was redesignated as the 5th (Northumberland Fusiliers) Regiment of Foot:
The King has been pleased to command, that the 5th, or Northumberland, Regiment of Foot shall in future be equipped as a Fusilier Regiment, and be styled the 5th Regiment of Foot, or Northumberland Fusiliers.

The regiment, which was increased to two battalions in 1857, saw active service in the Indian Rebellion of 1857 and the Second Anglo-Afghan War in 1880.

The regiment was not fundamentally affected by the Cardwell Reforms of the 1870s, which gave it a depot at Fenham Barracks in Newcastle upon Tyne from 1873, or by the Childers reforms of 1881 – as it already possessed two battalions, there was no need for it to amalgamate with another regiment. At the same time the existing militia and rifle volunteer units of the district became battalions of the regiment. Accordingly, on 1 July 1881 the Northumberland Fusiliers was formed as the county regiment of Northumberland, (including the Counties of the towns of Newcastle upon Tyne and Berwick-upon-Tweed) with the following battalions:

Regular battalions
 1st Battalion  (formerly 1st Battalion, 5th Foot)
 2nd Battalion (formerly 2nd Battalion, 5th Foot)
Militia battalion
 3rd (Militia) Battalion (formerly Northumberland Light Infantry Militia)
Volunteer battalions
 1st Northumberland (Northumberland and Berwick-on-Tweed) Rifle Volunteer Corps: renamed as 1st Volunteer Battalion in 1883
 2nd Northumberland Rifle Volunteer Corps: renamed as 2nd Volunteer Battalion in 1883
 1st Newcastle upon Tyne Rifle Volunteer Corps: renamed as 3rd Volunteer Battalion in 1883

The Second Boer War
The 1st Battalion formed part of the 9th Brigade together with the 2nd Northamptonshire Regiment, 2nd Yorkshire Light Infantry, and part of the 1st Loyal North Lancashire Regiment. While the 2nd Battalion sailed as corps troops, and was then brigaded with the 1st Royal Scots, and 1st Sherwood Foresters, under General Sir William Gatacre. The battalions fought in the following battles: Battle of Belmont, Battle of Graspan, Battle of Modder River, Battle of Magersfontein, Battle of Stormberg, Battle of Reddersberg, Battle of Sanna's Post and the Battle of Nooitgedacht.

Reorganisations 1900–1908
With the continuation of the war in South Africa, a number of regiments containing large centres of population formed additional regular battalions. The Northumberland Fusiliers formed 3rd and 4th regular Battalions in February 1900, when the militia battalion was relabeled as the 5th battalion. The 3rd was stationed in South Africa, and in 1902 some of the men were in Antigua to guard the Boer prisoners of war placed there. The 4th formed part of the garrison in Ireland. Both were disbanded in 1907.

The 5th (militia) battalion (known as the 3rd battalion until February 1900) was embodied in December 1899, and from February 1900 to July 1901 was stationed at Malta.

In 1908 a reorganisation of reserve forces was carried out under the Territorial and Reserve Forces Act 1907. The militia were transferred to a new "Special Reserve" while the Volunteer Force was reorganised to become the Territorial Force. The "Volunteer Battalion" designation was discarded, and territorial battalions were numbered on after those of the regular army and special reserve. The new organisation was thus:
 1st Battalion
 2nd Battalion
 3rd Battalion (Special Reserve)
 4th Battalion (T.F.) (HQ at Hencotes in Hexham, from bulk of 1st Volunteer Battalion)
 5th Battalion (T.F.) (HQ at Church Street in Walker (since demolished), redesignation of 2nd Volunteer Battalion)
 6th (City) Battalion (T.F.) (HQ at Northumberland Road in Newcastle, redesignation of 3rd Volunteer Battalion)
 7th Battalion (T.F.) (HQ at Fenkle Street in Alnwick, from part of 1st Volunteer Battalion)
 8th (Cyclist) Battalion (HQ at Hutton Terrace in Newcastle, formed 1908, redesignated Northern Cyclist Battalion in 1910 and transferred to the Army Cyclist Corps in 1915)

First World War

During the First World War, the Northumberland Fusiliers expanded to 52 battalions and 29 of them served overseas.  It was the second largest infantry regiment of the British Army during the war, surpassed only by the 88 battalions of the London Regiment.

The increase in strength was done partly by forming duplicates of existing T.F. battalions, and partly by the creation of new "Service" battalions. An example of the first instance was the 4th Battalion which was renumbered as the 1/4th in August 1914 on forming a duplicate 2/4th Battalion. A 3/4th Battalion followed in June 1915.

Among the Service Battalions were the Tyneside Scottish (20th - 23rd Battalions) and the Tyneside Irish (24th - 27th Battalions), while the 17th (Service) Battalion was formed by staff of the North Eastern Railway, and was involved in railway construction.

They earned 67 battle honours and won five Victoria Crosses, but at the cost of over 16,000 dead.  The battalions mostly saw action on the Western Front, but also in Macedonia, Gallipoli, Egypt and Italy.

In June 1935 George V celebrated his silver jubilee. This opportunity was taken of granting royal status to four regiments, principally in recognition of their service in the previous war.
On the occasion of His Majesty's Birthday and in commemoration of the completion of the twenty-fifth year of his reign, the King has been graciously pleased... to approve that the following regiments shall in future enjoy the distinction "Royal" and shall henceforth be designated:—
 5th Royal Inniskilling Dragoon Guards
 The Buffs (Royal East Kent Regiment)
 The Royal Northumberland Fusiliers
 The Royal Norfolk Regiment 

In 1936, the Royal Northumberland Fusiliers was one of four line infantry regiments selected for conversion to specialised Divisional (Machine Gun) or Divisional (Support) Battalions. The other regiments selected were the Cheshire Regiment, the Manchester Regiment and the Middlesex Regiment.

Second World War

The regiment expanded to ten battalions during the Second World War. Although most of them served as divisional machine gun or support battalions, some of them formed motorcycle, searchlight, tank, reconnaissance, ordinary infantry and even deception units.  They saw action with the BEF in North-West Europe in 1940 and the 21st Army Group in 1944–45, North Africa 1940–43, Italy 1943–45, the fall of Singapore and the defence of the United Kingdom.

Korean War
The 1st Battalion was attached to the 29th Independent Infantry Brigade, which had been sent to Korea to reinforce the Allied effort there. When it arrived in Korea in December 1950, the Brigade comprised:
 1st Battalion, the Royal Northumberland Fusiliers
 1st Battalion, the Gloucestershire Regiment 
 1st Battalion, the Royal Ulster Rifles
 8th King's Royal Irish Hussars
 C Squadron, 7th Royal Tank Regiment, with specialised armour
 45 Field Regiment RA
 11 LAA Battery RA
 170 Mortar Battery RA
 plus supporting units.

In April 1951 the battalion was involved in the Battle of the Imjin River, as the brigade stood in the path of the Chinese Spring Offensive. In July 1951, it was re-organized as 29th British Infantry Brigade and absorbed into the 1st Commonwealth Division.

Regimental museum
The Fusiliers Museum of Northumberland is based in Alnwick Castle.

Badges and dress distinctions
The 5th Regiment of Foot was one of the 'Six Old Corps' entitled to use their 'ancient badge' (St George killing the Dragon) on Regimental Colours, drums and other devices rather than the typical GR cipher as used by normal Regiments of the Line, a distinction first officially recorded in 1747.

In the centre of their colours was an image of St. George killing the dragon, this being their ancient badge, and in the three corners of their second colour, the rose and crown.

The regiment wore a distinctively-coloured hackle or plume on the fusilier cap and later on the beret. The hackle was red over white, and was authorised in June 1829. This replaced the white feather plume the regiment had adopted following the Battle of St Lucia in 1778, supposedly taken from the headgear of fallen French troops. The 5th Foot was the only line regiment,  since the introduction of the shako in 1800, to wear the white plume (other regiments having white over red) although the right to wear it was only officially granted in 1824.  In 1829 a new model of shako was introduced and all infantry regiments were to wear a white plume, with the 5th Foot given a unique plume of red over white. This became a red over white 'ball tuft' in 1835 and later became a hackle in the same colours.

Victoria Cross
The following members of the regiment were recipients of the Victoria Cross.
 James Bulmer Johnson
 Patrick McHale
 Peter McManus
 Ernest Sykes
 Thomas Bryan
 Robert Henry Cain (Attached Staffordshire Regiment)
 James Joseph Bernard Jackman
 Wilfred Wood
 John Scott Youll

George Cross
Only one member of the regiment was the recipient of the George Cross:
 Derek Godfrey Kinne

Amalgamation
On 23 April 1968, following the publication of the following notice in the London Gazette:

The regiment was amalgamated into the new Royal Regiment of Fusiliers.

Battle honours
Early wars
By 1881 the 5th foot had been awarded the following battle honours:

Second Boer War
The regiment received two battle honours for the conflict: "Modder River" and "South Africa, 1899–1902".

First World War
The regiment was awarded the following 67 battle honours:

 Mons
 Le Cateau
 Retreat from Mons
 Marne 1914
 Aisne 1914 '18
 La Bassée 1914
 Messines 1914 '17 '18
 Armentières 1914
 Ypres 1914 '15 '17 '18
 Nonne Bosschen
 Gravenstafel
 St. Julien
 Frezenburg
 Bellewaarde
 Loos
 Somme 1916 '18
 Albert 1916 '18

 Bazentin
 Delville Wood
 Pozières
 Flers-Courcelette
 Morval
 Thiepval
 Le Transloy
 Ancre Heights
 Ancre 1916
 Arras 1917 '18
 Scarpe 1917 '18
 Arleux
 Pilckem
 Langemarck 1917
 Menin Road
 Polygon Wood
 Broodseinde

 Passchendaele
 Cambrai 1917 '18
 St. Quentin
 Bapaume 1918
 Rosieres
 Lys
 Estaires
 Hazebrouck
 Bailleuil
 Kemmel
 Béthune
 Scherpenberg
 Drocourt Quéant
 Hindenburg Line
 Epéhy
 Canal du Nord
 St. Quentin Canal

 Beaurevoir
 Courtrai
 Selle
 Valenciennes
 Sambre
 France and Flanders 1914–18
 Piave
 Vittorio Veneto
 Italy 1917–18
 Struma
 Macedonia 1915–18
 Suvla
 Landing at Suvla
 Scimitar Hill
 Gallipoli 1915
 Egypt 1916–17

Those shown in bold print were selected to be borne on the king's colours.

Second World War
They were awarded twenty-nine battle honours:

 Defence of Escaut
 Arras Counter Attack
 St. Omer-La Bassée
 Dunkirk 1940
 Odon
 Caen
 Cagny

 Falaise
 Nederrijn
 Rhineland
 North-West Europe 1940 '44-45
 Sidi Barrani
 Defence of Tobruk
 Tobruk 1941

 Belhamed
 Cauldron
 Ruweisat Ridge
 El Alamein
 Advance on Tripoli
 Medenine
 North Africa 1940-43

 Salerno
 Volturno Crossing
 Monte Camino
 Garigliano Crossing
 Cassino II
 Italy 1943-45
 Singapore Island

Those shown in bold print were selected to be borne on the king's colours.

Korean War
In August 1958, the Regiment was awarded the following battle honours:
 Imjin
 Seoul
 Kowang-San
 Korea 1950-51.
Those shown in bold print were selected to be borne on the regimental colours.

Colonels —with early names for the regiment
Colonels have included:

Named after Colonel
English regiment of the Dutch Anglo-Scots Brigade
 1674 Colonel Daniel, Viscount Clare 
 1675 Major-General Sir John Fenwick; resigned after quarrelling with William 
 1676 Colonel Henry Wisely; drowned at sea 
 1680 Colonel Thomas Monck; died 1687
 1687 Lieutenant-General Thomas Tollemache
 English establishment
 1688 Lieutenant-General Thomas Tollemache; transferred to Coldstream Guards, May 1689
 1689 Colonel Edward Lloyd
 1690 Major-General Thomas Fairfax 
 1704 Lieutenant-General Thomas Pearce
 1732 Lieutenant-General Sir John Cope KB
 1737 Lieutenant-General Alexander Irwine —Irvine's or Irwin's or Irwine's Foot

5th Regiment of Foot
 1752 Colonel Charles Whitefoord
 1754 Major-General Lord George Bentinck
 1759 Field Marshal Studholme Hodgson
 1768 General Hugh, Earl Percy KG

5th (Northumberland) Regiment of Foot
 1784 Lieutenant-General Hon. Edward Stopford —Stopford's Foot
 1794 Field Marshal Sir Alured Clarke GCB —Clarke's Foot
 1801 Lieutenant-General Richard England —England's Foot
 1812 Lieutenant-General William Wynyard —Wynyard's Foot
 1819 General Sir Henry Johnson GCB —Johnson's Foot

5th (Northumberland Fusiliers) Regiment of Foot
1835 General Sir Charles Colville GCB GCH
1843 Lieutenant-General Sir Jasper Nicolls KCB
1849 General Sir John Grey KCB
1856 Lieutenant-General William Lovelace Walton
1865 Major-General William Longworth Dames
1868 Major-General Edward Rowley Hill

Northumberland Fusiliers
 1878 General William Lygon Pakenham, 4th Earl of Longford
 1887 General Joseph Henry Laye
 1895 Lieutenant-General Frederick Arthur Willis
 1899 Lieutenant-General Sir George Bryan Milman
 1915 Major-General Sir Percival Spearman Wilkinson

Royal Northumberland Fusiliers
 1935 Major-General William Norman Herbert
 1947 Major-General Harold de Riemer Morgan
 1953 Field Marshal Sir Francis Wogan Festing
 1965 Major-General Roger Ellis Tudor St John

In popular culture 

In the beginning of the Sherlock Holmes story A Study in Scarlet, Sir Arthur Conan Doyle states that Dr. John Watson served with the 5th Northumberland Fusiliers as an assistant surgeon.

See also 
 Fusiliers Museum of Northumberland
 Northumbrian tartan
 Tyneside Irish Brigade
 Tyneside Scottish Brigade

Notes

References

Sources

External links

 The Royal Northumberland Fusiliers
 WW1 Photos.com: Northumberland Fusiliers
 
 Royal Northumberland Fusiliers North East Medals
 50th Division
 Northumberland Fusiliers Anglo-Boer War
 Aden Britain's Small Wars
 Fifth Foot reenactment group

 
Infantry regiments of the British Army
Fusilier regiments of the British Army
Fusilier regiments
1674 establishments in England
Northumberland Fusiliers
Military units and formations of the United Kingdom in the Korean War
Military units and formations of the Second Boer War
Regiments of the British Army in World War I
Regiments of the British Army in World War II
Military units and formations established in 1674
Military units and formations disestablished in 1968